Welwyn Garden City railway station serves the town of Welwyn Garden City in Hertfordshire, England. Train services are currently provided by Thameslink and Great Northern.

History

A station named Welwyn Junction was opened with the Hertford and Welwyn Junction Railway on 1 March 1858. This station ceased to be used for services on 1 September 1860.

A halt named Welwyn Garden City Halt opened on 1 September 1920, shortly after the town was incorporated; this was on the now defunct Luton/Dunstable branch line, slightly further north than the present station. This line cuts west and north through Sherrardspark Wood, and on towards  via what is now Ayot Greenway.

The present Welwyn Garden City station opened on 20 September 1926; Welwyn Garden City Halt was closed at the same time. Prior to this, services to Luton and the Hertford line, which cut east through the town, were handled from nearby . The Hertford branch line was closed to rail passenger traffic in 1951 and to goods in 1966, whilst the Dunstable line fell victim to the Beeching Axe in April 1965 (although goods traffic survived until 1971).

When the Howard Centre shopping centre was opened in October 1990, the original ticket hall was demolished. It is now inside the Howard Centre with steps linking down to the original bridge and then platforms. 

The line near the station has seen two serious train crashes, one in 1935, and another in 1957.

Facilities
Welwyn Garden City was semi-refurbished by First Capital Connect during 2007, which saw improved lighting installed, new bus -shelter-style waiting rooms and improved toilets on each platform island. The refurbishments also saw the installation of Ticket Gates. There is also a station cafe located on Platforms 1 and 2, recently reopened as "The Garden Line".

The station has direct access to the Howard Centre. The shopping centre also incorporates the station's ticket office on the first floor. There are 4 ticket machines; 3 standard touch screen machines and one "card only" machine. There are also help-points located within the station.

Towards the end of 2007 Welwyn Garden City was awarded "Secure Station" status, along with many other stations along the Great Northern route as part of a stations improvement programme. As part of this award, many additional cameras were installed at the station.

Services
Services at Welwyn Garden City are operated by Thameslink and Great Northern using  and  EMUs.

The typical off-peak service in trains per hour is:

During the peak hours, the service to Letchworth Garden City is extended to Cambridge and the service to and from Moorgate is increased to 4 tph.

The station is also served by a small number of Thameslink operated services to and from  via the Thameslink Core.

Late evening and weekend stopping services used to run to and from London Kings Cross rather than Moorgate, but from 13 December 2015 Great Northern introduced a weekend service on the line and extended evening hours until the end of service.

Connections
The station is also served by various buses operated by Arriva Shires & Essex, Centrebus and Uno.

Station layout
The Up Yard sidings at Welwyn Garden City consists of 6 unelectrified roads, currently used for the twice-weekly reversal of empty gypsum wagons returning from Hitchin to Peak Forest along occasional Rail tamper units and departmental wagon storage.

The EMU sidings, just north of the station, consists of 9 electrified roads with the 8-car 365s or 700s able to use only 5 of the sidings because if they used the other sidings, they would block the siding next to it.

Platforms 2 (southbound) and 3 (northbound) are in regular use for services to/from London Kings Cross and Cambridge. Platform 3 is also used for terminating trains for the carriage sidings and where trains from the carriage sidings form into passenger service - a few southbound trains start from here at peak times rather than platform 4 as they can access the flyover onto the Up Slow line.

Platform 4 is used for services to/from Moorgate, terminating trains for the carriage sidings and where trains from the carriage sidings form into passenger service.

Platform 1 (the outer face of the up island) sees only occasional use as it has no direct access for northbound (down) terminating trains or empty units coming into service from the carriage sidings. The latter must cross over the flyover into the up reversing siding and then shunt back into the platform via the reversing line.

The West exit off the passenger footbridge leads into the Howard centre where the main station ticket office is located on the first floor while the East exit leads to the Broadwater industrial area.

Oyster card ticketing 

Oyster cards are currently not accepted on journeys to Welwyn Garden City. The train operating company, Govia, agreed to extend London Zonal Fares to include Potters Bar by September 2015 when they won the Great Northern franchise. More recently Transport for London indicated that Welwyn Garden City and Potters Bar are two of the top four priority stations for the extension of London Zonal Fares and that introduction of the required software is expected to be completed by the end of 2018.

References

Bibliography

External links

Timetable downloads for Welwyn Garden City from Great Northern
Welwyn Garden City Train station information from Great Northern

Railway stations in Hertfordshire
DfT Category C1 stations
Former London and North Eastern Railway stations
Railway stations in Great Britain opened in 1926
Railway stations served by Govia Thameslink Railway
Welwyn Garden City